Cuicun Town is a town within Changping District, Beijing, China. Bounded by part of Taihang Mountain Range to its north, Cuicun borders Yanshou Town in its north, Xingshou Town in its east, Xiaotangshan and Baishan Towns in its south, as well as Nanshao and Shisanling Towns in its west. The result of the 2020 census indicated that the town was home to 24,630 inhabitants.

The name of this town literally translates to "Cui's Village", and it was given for the town government's location between the Dongcui and Xicui Villages.

History

Administrative divisions 

By 2021, Cuicun Town had the following 12 villages under its administration:

Gallery

See also 

 List of township-level divisions of Beijing

References 

Changping District
Towns in Beijing